The UK Dance Chart is a chart that ranks the biggest-selling singles which are released in the United Kingdom. The chart is compiled by the Official Chart Company and is based on both physical and digital sales of tracks, classified as 'electronic dance'. The dates listed in the menus below represent the Saturday after the Sunday the chart was announced, as per the way the dates are given in chart publications such as the ones produced by Billboard, Guinness, and Virgin.

Number-ones

 – the single was simultaneously number-one on the singles chart.

See also

List of UK Singles Chart number ones of the 2010s
List of UK Dance Albums Chart number ones of 2012
List of UK Independent Singles Chart number ones of 2012
List of UK Singles Downloads Chart number ones of the 2000s
List of UK Rock & Metal Singles Chart number ones of 2012
List of UK R&B Singles Chart number ones of 2012

References

External links
Dance Singles Top 40 at the Official Charts Company
UK Top 40 Dance Singles at BBC Radio 1

Number-one dance singles
UK Dance Singles
2012